Joy Boushel (born 1959) is an actress who appeared in several movies and TV shows from 1980 to 1990.

Boushel's acting career has consisted of Pick-up Summer (1980), Terror Train (1980), Quest for Fire (1981), Humongous (1982), Thrillkill (1984), The Fly (1986), Keeping Track (1986), Look Who's Talking (1989), and Cursed (1990).

Filmography

References

External links

1959 births
American film actresses
Living people
American television actresses
21st-century American women